The European Racquetball Federation (ERF) is the governing body for racquetball in Europe to promote the sport of racquetball in Europe. The ERF was founded on 27 June 1985 in Zoetermeer, The Netherlands.

Every two years the ERF organizes the European Racquetball Championships, and every year organizes the European Racquetball Tour (ERT).

Presidents

List of members

Events
European Championships, Team and Individual
European Masters Championships
European Juniors Championships

See also 
European Racquetball Championships
European Racquetball Tour
Racquetball

External links
Official ERF website

Racquetball